Michael Hansen (born 14 February 1990) is a Danish competitive sailor.

He competed at the 2016 Summer Olympics in Rio de Janeiro, in the men's Laser class.

References

1990 births
Living people
Danish male sailors (sport)
Olympic sailors of Denmark
Sailors at the 2016 Summer Olympics – Laser